Nikola Poposki (born 24 October 1977 in Skopje) was Minister of Foreign Affairs of the Republic of Macedonia until 31 May 2017. Prior to that role, in 2010–2011 he served as the country's ambassador to the European Union.

Education 
Nikola Poposki received a BA in Economics from Skopje University and from Nice University in 2002 and a Master in Languages and International Trade in the EU from Skopje University and Rennes University in 2004. He later received a master's degree from the College of Europe.

Career

Foreign policy 
Speaking to the Israel Council on Foreign Relations in March 2016, Poposki addressed, in his capacity as Foreign Minister, the recent critiques of the international press with regards to his country's handling of the migrant crisis. He stated: "We’re willing to give them humane treatment and safe transit, but no way will we take the burden for problems that the EU is not ready to resolve," referring to the directives demanded of European countries onto Macedonia even though the latter has been refused so far membership to either the European Community or to the North Atlantic Treaty Organization.

Awards and decorations 
2016:  Grand Officer of the Order of the Star of Italian Solidarity

See also
List of foreign ministers in 2017

References

External links 
 Ministry of Foreign Affairs
 Foreign relations of the Republic of Macedonia on Wikipedia

1977 births
Ambassadors of North Macedonia to the European Union
College of Europe alumni
Deputy Prime Ministers of North Macedonia
Foreign Ministers of North Macedonia
Living people
Diplomats from Skopje
Macedonian economists
Politicians from Skopje
Ss. Cyril and Methodius University of Skopje alumni